Mu Coronae Borealis, Latinized from μ Coronae Borealis, is a solitary, ruby-hued star located in the northern constellation of Corona Borealis. It is faintly visible to the naked eye, having an apparent visual magnitude of 5.12. Based upon an annual parallax shift of 5.27 mas, it is located roughly 620 light years from the Sun. This is an evolved red giant star with a stellar classification of M1.5 IIIb. It is currently on the asymptotic giant branch and is a variable star of uncertain type, showing a change in brightness with an amplitude of 0.0147 magnitude and a frequency of 0.02455 cycles per day, or 40.7 days/cycle. On average, it is radiating 932 times the Sun's luminosity from its enlarged photosphere at an effective temperature of 3,889 K.

References

Corona Borealis, Mu
Corona Borealis
Corona Borealis, Mu
Durchmusterung objects
Coronae Borealis, 06
139153
076307
5800